General of the Cavalry (General der Kavallerie) was a rank in the Imperial Army of the Holy Roman Empire, Imperial Army of the Austrian Empire and the Army of Austria-Hungary.

In 1908, it was approximately equivalent to a United States Army lieutenant general, and usually commanded either a corps or an army. It was one rank below Feldmarschall until September 1915 when the rank of Generaloberst was introduced. It was equivalent to the ranks of General der Infanterie (introduced in 1908 for infantry officers), and Feldzeugmeister (for artillery and engineer officers). Prior to 1908, infantry officers also used the rank of Feldzeugmeister. The next lower rank was Feldmarschallleutnant (usually a divisional commander), which is often rendered as Feldmarschall-Leutnant.

List of officers who were Generals of the Cavalry

A 
 Johann Nepomuk Martin Freiherr von Appel (1826–1906)
 Heinrich Moritz von Attems-Heiligenkreuz (1852–1926)

B 
 Maximilian Anton Karl, Count Baillet de Latour (1737–1806)
 Count Heinrich von Bellegarde (1756–1845), 1799 (Holy Roman Empire and Austrian Empire), promoted to Field Marshal in 1809.

C 
 Eduard Clam-Gallas (Austria, 1805–1891)
 Louis Charles Folliot de Crenneville (Austria, 1763–1840)

H 
 Ignaz Count Hardegg (1772-1848) 
 Karl Georg Huyn (Austria-Hungary, 1857–1938)

K 

 Michael von Kienmayer (Austria, 1755–1828)
 Johann von Klenau (Austria, 1758–1819)

M 
 Maximilian, Count of Merveldt (Austria, 1764–1815)

N 
 Erwin von Neipperg (1813–1897)
 Friedrich Moritz von Nostitz-Rieneck (Austria, 1728–1796)

O 
 Andreas O'Reilly von Ballinlough (Austria, 1742–1832)

R 
 Johann Sigismund Riesch (Austria, 1750–1821)
 Prince Franz Seraph of Rosenberg-Orsini (Austria, 1761–1832)

V 
 Karl von Vincent (Austria, 1757–1834)

W 
 Dagobert Sigmund von Wurmser (Holy Roman Empire, 1724–1797)
 Ludwig Georg Thedel, Graf von Wallmoden (Austria, 1769–1862)

Notes

References
 
 
 

Military ranks of Austria
Lists of Austrian military personnel
Austria